Hieracium hieronymi is a forb of genus Hieracium in the family Asteraceae.
and found only in Ecuador once in a collection gathered in 1871 from  Pichincha; the description included with the specimen was "Crescit prope Panecillo haud procul a praedio Hacienda Pesillo inter urben Quito et La Esperanza", and in a more recent specimen reported by L. Mille still some years ago (before the Second World War) gathered from Carchi and deposited in the Berlin Herbarium where the taxonomic problems have remained intact.

It is threatened by habitat loss.  It has not been found growing in the protected lands of páramo.

References

hieronymi
Flora of Ecuador
Data deficient plants
Páramo flora
Taxonomy articles created by Polbot